Hector James McIvor, OBE (24 November 1900 – 12 May 1992) was an Australian politician. Born in Melbourne, he attended state schools before becoming a representative for an oil company. He was active in local politics as a member of Footscray City Council. In 1955, he was elected to the Australian House of Representatives as the Labor member for Gellibrand, succeeding the Labor-turned-Labor (Anti-Communist) MP Jack Mullens. McIvor held the seat until his retirement in 1972. He died in 1992.

References

1900 births
1992 deaths
Australian Labor Party members of the Parliament of Australia
Members of the Australian House of Representatives for Gellibrand
Members of the Australian House of Representatives
Australian Officers of the Order of the British Empire
20th-century Australian politicians